General Owe Erik Axel Wiktorin (born 7 May 1940) is a retired Swedish Air Force officer. Wiktorin was Supreme Commander of the Swedish Armed Forces from 1994 to 2000. His time as Supreme Commander was marked by major cutbacks of the Swedish defense.

Early life
Wiktorin was born on 7 May 1940 in Motala, Sweden, the son of Erik Wiktorin, a chief accountant, and his wife Esther (née Johnson). Wiktorin was dreaming of becoming a pilot at a young age and he built aircraft models during when growing up in Askersund. He passed his studentexamen in 1961. 191.5 centimeters tall, Wiktorin was almost too tall for the fighter's cockpits, but he was accepted and trained as a pilot at the Swedish Air Force Flying School in Ljungbyhed from 1961 to 1962 eventually becoming an officer in the Swedish Air Force in 1964.

Career
Wiktorin was an attack pilot at Skaraborg Wing (F 7) from 1964 to 1969 and attack squadron commander at Skaraborg Wing from 1969 to 1971. Wiktorin studied the higher course at the Swedish Armed Forces Staff College and served at the Planning Department at the Defence Staff from 1971 to 1973. He then studied at the Air Command and Staff College in the United States from 1979 to 1980.

He was head of the Planning Department at the Defence Staff from 1980 to 1983 and was deputy wing commander at Jämtland Wing (F 4) from 1983 to 1984 and head of Section 1 of the Air Staff from 1 October 1984 to 1986. In 1986 he was promoted to major general and was appointed head of the Planning Management in the Defence Staff as well as Deputy Chief of the Defence Staff. In 1991 he became lieutenant general and Chief of the Defence Staff and in 1992 he was appointed military commander of the Southern Military District (Milo S), taking command on 1 October. On 1 July 1994, he was promoted to general and became Supreme Commander of the Swedish Armed Forces. When Wiktorin became Supreme Commander in 1994, a massive reorganization of the Swedish defense was carried out when 110 defence agencies were coordinated into one with control from the Swedish Armed Forces Headquarters in Stockholm. The military also underwent one of its greatest transformations ever, from the Cold War defence of invasions and major conscript armies to a more downturned flexible response defence. His time as Supreme Commander was also marked by major cutbacks of the Swedish defense. Wiktorin stayed in the position of Supreme Commander until 30 June 2000.

In 1985 he became a member of the Royal Swedish Academy of War Sciences. On 2 October 1998, Wiktorin became honorary member number 20 of the Lund Academic Officer Society (Lunds Akademiska Officerssällskap). On 6 June 2000 he was awarded the H. M. The King's Medal of the 12th size in gold with chain "for outstanding work for the Swedish defense." Wiktorin was chairman of the Swedish Association for Hunting and Wildlife Management (Svenska Jägareförbundet) from 2003 to 2007 and then became an honorary member.

Personal life
In 1965, Wiktorin married in Cajs Gårding (born 1943), the daughter of engineer Folke Gårding and Signe (née Domeij). Together they have two sons, Martin and Björn.

Dates of rank
1964 – Second lieutenant
19?? – Lieutenant
19?? – Captain
1975 – Major
19?? – Lieutenant colonel
1983 – Colonel
19?? – Senior colonel
1986 – Major general
1991 – Lieutenant general
1994 – General

Awards and decorations

Swedish
  H. M. The King's Medal, 12th size gold medal worn around the neck on a chain of gold (2000)
  For Zealous and Devoted Service of the Realm
  Home Guard Medal of Merit
  Swedish Air Force Volunteers Association Medal of Merit
  Swedish Air Force Volunteers Association Merit Badge

Foreign
  Grand Cross of the Order of the Dannebrog
  Grand Cross of the Order of the White Rose of Finland
  Commander of the Legion of Honour
  2nd Class of the Order of the Cross of the Eagle (2 February 2001)

Bibliography

References

Further reading

External links
Article on Wiktorin 

1940 births
Living people
Swedish Air Force generals
People from Motala Municipality
Members of the Royal Swedish Academy of War Sciences
20th-century Swedish military personnel
Chiefs of the Defence Staff (Sweden)